Sándor Jakabfy (1 May 1931 – April 2010) was a Hungarian sprinter. He competed in the men's 200 metres at the 1956 Summer Olympics.

References

1931 births
2010 deaths
Athletes (track and field) at the 1956 Summer Olympics
Hungarian male sprinters
Olympic athletes of Hungary
Place of birth missing